Yongki Aribowo (born 23 November 1989) is an Indonesian professional footballer who plays as a forward for Liga 2 club PSKC Cimahi. He was a member of the Indonesia national football team in AFF Suzuki Cup 2010.

Club career 
Yongki, who is usually called or Bowo, started off his football career in SSB Sinar Jaya Tulungagung. He later continued his youth career to Perseta Tulungagung Junior. However, in Perseta Junior, he often sat on bench. Yongki plays as a striker. Whenever he is in front of the opponent's goal, he can always terrorize the goalkeeper and defenders. He also has the speed to run at above-average. These skills made Persik Kediri became interested in him and recruited him as a player in Persik Junior.

East Java derby between Persik Kediri and Persela Lamongan was the game that he would never forget for this is the game when he shows off his skill to Persik Kediri's supporters, Persikmania. A bait heading measured from his partner Saktiawan Sinaga, he finished it with a fantastic move. Everyone started to turn to him. He entertains many Persik Kediri supporters. Brawijaya Stadium is always waiting for his goals and his actions. Being paired with Saktiawan Sinaga makes him greatly feared by opponent's defense. Agility to bring the ball is also noteworthy. With a height of 175 cm and weighs 63 kg, he is also adept at eating up balls.

He had been linked with Wellington Phoenix and Melbourne Victory during 2010 summer transfer window.

On 23 February 2018, he joined the newly promoted club Aceh United to play in Liga 2.

International career 
In 2009, Yongki played to represent the Indonesia national football team, in 2009 SEA Games. In October 2010, Yongki was called up into senior national team and making his debut as a substitute player in a friendly match against Uruguay.

International goals 
Yongki Aribowo: International under-23 goals

|}

Honours

International 
Indonesia U-23
 Southeast Asian Games  Silver medal: 2011
Indonesia
 AFF Championship runner-up: 2010

References

External links 
 
 

1989 births
Living people
Javanese people
People from Tulungagung Regency
Sportspeople from East Java
Indonesian footballers
Indonesia international footballers
Indonesia youth international footballers
PS Barito Putera players
Pelita Bandung Raya players
Arema F.C. players
Persik Kediri players
Sriwijaya F.C. players
Badak Lampung F.C. players
Badak Lampung F.C.
Liga 2 (Indonesia) players
Liga 1 (Indonesia) players
Association football forwards
Association football midfielders
Southeast Asian Games silver medalists for Indonesia
Southeast Asian Games medalists in football
Competitors at the 2011 Southeast Asian Games